Frederic Henry Robinson was a Major League Baseball player.

He was the older brother of Hall of Fame manager Wilbert Robinson.

Sources

Major League Baseball second basemen
Cincinnati Outlaw Reds players
Baseball players from Massachusetts
1856 births
1933 deaths
19th-century baseball players